Millenarianism or millenarism (from Latin , "containing a thousand") is the belief by a religious, social, or political group or movement in a coming fundamental transformation of society, after which "all things will be changed". Millenarianism exists in various cultures and religions worldwide, with various interpretations of what constitutes a transformation.

These movements believe in radical changes to society after a major cataclysm or transformative event.

Millenarianist movements can be secular (not espousing a particular religion) or religious in nature, and are therefore not necessarily linked to millennialist movements in Christianity.

Terminology 
The terms "millennialism" and "millenarianism"  are sometimes used interchangeably. Stephen Jay Gould has argued that this usage is incorrect, stating:

The application of an apocalyptic timetable to the changing of the world has happened in many cultures and religions, continues to this day, and is not relegated to the sects of major world religions, both Abrahamic and non-Abrahamic. Increasingly in the study of apocalyptic new religious movements, millenarianism is used to refer to a more cataclysmic and destructive arrival of a utopian period as compared to millennialism which is often used to denote a more peaceful arrival and is more closely associated with a one thousand year utopia.

Millennialism often refers to a specific type of Christian millenarianism, and is sometimes referred to as Chiliasm from the New Testament use of the Greek chilia (thousand). It is part of the broader form of apocalyptic expectation. A core doctrine in some variations of Christian eschatology is the expectation that the Second Coming is very near and that there will be an establishment of a Kingdom of God on Earth. According to an interpretation of biblical prophecies in the Book of Revelation, this Kingdom of God on Earth will last a thousand years (a millennium) or more.

Theology 
Many if not most millenarian groups claim that the current society and its rulers are corrupt, unjust, or otherwise wrong, and that they will soon be destroyed by a powerful force. The harmful nature of the status quo is considered intractable without the anticipated dramatic change. Henri Desroche observed that millenarian movements often envisioned three periods in which change might occur. First, the elect members of the movement will be increasingly oppressed, leading to the second period in which the movement resists the oppression. The third period brings about a new utopian age, liberating the members of the movement.

In the modern world, economic rules, perceived immorality or vast conspiracies are seen as generating oppression. Only dramatic events are seen as able to change the world and the change is anticipated to be brought about, or survived, by a group of the devout and dedicated. In most millenarian scenarios, the disaster or battle to come will be followed by a new, purified world in which the believers will be rewarded.

While many millennial groups are pacifistic, millenarian beliefs have been claimed as causes for people to ignore conventional rules of behavior, which can result in violence directed inwards (such as the Jonestown mass suicides) or outwards (such as the Aum Shinrikyo terrorist acts). It sometimes includes a belief in supernatural powers or predetermined victory. In some cases, millenarians withdraw from society to await the intervention of God. This is also known as world-rejection.

Millenarian ideologies or religious sects sometimes appear in oppressed peoples, with examples such as the 19th-century Ghost Dance movement among Native Americans, early Mormons, and the 19th and 20th-century cargo cults among isolated Pacific Islanders.

The Catechism of the Catholic Church rejects all forms of millenarianism and its variations:

See also 

 Amillennialism
 Center for Millennial Studies
 
 Fifteen Signs before Doomsday
 Millenarianism in colonial societies
 Postmillennialism
 Premillennialism
 Singularitarianism
 Taki Unquy
 Timeline of the far future

References

Further reading 

 Burrage, Champlin. "The Fifth Monarchy Insurrections," The English Historical Review, Vol. XXV, 1910.
 Burridge, Kenelm. "New Heaven, New Earth: A Study of Millenarian Activities" (Basil Blackwell. Original printing 1969, three reprints 1972, 1980, 1986)  pb.  hb.
 CenSAMM. "Millenarianism." In James Crossley and Alastair Lockhart (eds.) Critical Dictionary of Apocalyptic and Millenarian Movements. 2021
 Cohn, Norman. The Pursuit of the Millennium: Revolutionary Millenarians and Mystical Anarchists of the Middle Ages, revised and expanded (New York: Oxford University Press, [1957] 1970). (revised and expanded 1990) 
 
 Gray, John. Black Mass: Apocalyptic Religion and the Death of Utopia (London: Penguin Books, [2007] 2008) 
 Hotson, Howard. Paradise Postponed: Johann Heinrich Alsted and the Birth of Calvinist Millenarianism, (Springer, 2000).
 Jue, Jeffrey K. Heaven Upon Earth: Joseph Mede and the Legacy of Mllenarianism, (Springer, 2006).
 Kaplan, Jeffrey. Radical Religion in America: Millenarian Movements from the Far Right to the Children of Noah (Syracuse, NY: Syracuse University Press, 1997).  
 Katz, David S. and Popkin, Richard H. Messianic Revolution: Radical Religious Politics to the End of the Second Millennium. (New York: Hill and Wang, 1999) .Review on H-Net
 Landes, Richard. Heaven on Earth: The Varieties of Millennial Experiences, (Oxford University Press, 2011).
 Lerner, Robert E. The Feast of Saint Abraham: Medieval Millenarians and the Jews, (University of Pennsylvania Press, 2000).
 Millenarianism and Messianism in Early Modern Culture (4 voll.), Dordrecht: Kluwer.
 Vol. 1: Goldish, Matt and Popkin, Richard H. (eds.). Jewish Messianism in the Early Modern World, 2001
 Vol. 2: Kottmnan, Karl (eds.). Catholic Milleniarism: From Savonarola to the Abbè Grégoire, 2001
 Vol. 3: Force, James E. and Popkin, Richard H. (eds.). The Millenarian Turn: Millenarian Contexts of Science, Politics and Everyday Anglo-American Life in the Seventeenth and Eighteenth Centuries, 2001
 Vol. 4: Laursen, John Christian and Popkin, Richard H. (eds.). Continental Millenarians: Protestants, Catholics, Heretics, 2001
 Schwartz, Hillel. The French Prophets: The History of a Millenarian Group in Eighteenth-Century England. Berkeley: University of California, 1980.
 Underwood, Grant. (1999) [1993]. The Millenarian World of Early Mormonism. Urbana: University of Illinois Press. 
 Voegelin, Eric. The New Science of Politics. University of Chicago Press (October 12, 2012).
 Wessinger, Catherine. (ed.), The Oxford Handbook of Millennialism, New York: Oxford University Press 2011.
 Wright, Ben and Dresser, Zachary W. (eds.) Apocalypse and the Millennium in the American Civil War Era. Baton Rouge, LA: Louisiana State University Press, 2013.

External links 
 Millennial Sites, Center for Millennial Studies at Boston University. List of links sorted by group type. (archive)
 Millenarianism. In James Crossley and Alastair Lockhart (eds.) Critical Dictionary of Apocalyptic and Millenarian Movements. 2021
 Millennium and Millenarianism, Catholic Encyclopedia.
 Catechism of Catholic Church, Part One, Section Two, Chapter Two, Article 7, 1. He will come again in glory, paragraph 676

 
Apocalypticism
Utopian movements